Scaptotrigona is a genus of bees belonging to the family Apidae.

The species of this genus are found in Central and Southern America.

Species:

Scaptotrigona affabra 
Scaptotrigona anaulax 
Scaptotrigona ascheri 
Scaptotrigona aurantipes 
Scaptotrigona baldwini 
Scaptotrigona barrocoloradensis 
Scaptotrigona bipunctata 
Scaptotrigona caduceus 
Scaptotrigona depilis 
Scaptotrigona ederi 
Scaptotrigona emersoni 
Scaptotrigona extranea 
Scaptotrigona faviziae 
Scaptotrigona fimbriata 
Scaptotrigona fulvicutis 
Scaptotrigona gonzalezi 
Scaptotrigona grueteri 
Scaptotrigona hellwegeri 
Scaptotrigona illescasi 
Scaptotrigona jujuyensis 
Scaptotrigona kuperi 
Scaptotrigona limae 
Scaptotrigona luteipennis 
Scaptotrigona macarenensis 
Scaptotrigona magdalenae 
Scaptotrigona mexicana 
Scaptotrigona nigrohirta 
Scaptotrigona nuda 
Scaptotrigona ochrotricha 
Scaptotrigona pasiphaea 
Scaptotrigona pectoralis 
Scaptotrigona polysticta 
Scaptotrigona postica 
Scaptotrigona psile 
Scaptotrigona rosellae 
Scaptotrigona santiago 
Scaptotrigona semiflava 
Scaptotrigona silviae 
Scaptotrigona stipula 
Scaptotrigona subobscuripennis 
Scaptotrigona tatacoensis 
Scaptotrigona totobi 
Scaptotrigona tricolorata 
Scaptotrigona tubiba 
Scaptotrigona vitorum 
Scaptotrigona wheeleri 
Scaptotrigona xanthotricha 
Scaptotrigona yungasensis

References

Meliponini